Guillermo Betancourt Scull (born 19 July 1963) is a Cuban fencer. He won a silver medal in the team foil event at the 1992 Summer Olympics.

Notes

References

External links
 

1963 births
Living people
Cuban male fencers
Olympic fencers of Cuba
Fencers at the 1980 Summer Olympics
Fencers at the 1992 Summer Olympics
Olympic silver medalists for Cuba
Medalists at the 1992 Summer Olympics
Pan American Games medalists in fencing
Pan American Games gold medalists for Cuba
Fencers at the 1987 Pan American Games
Olympic medalists in fencing
Medalists at the 1987 Pan American Games
20th-century Cuban people
21st-century Cuban people